Dam Ab (also Romanized as Dam Āb) is a village in Dinaran Rural District, in the Central District of Ardal County, Chaharmahal and Bakhtiari Province, Iran. At the 2006 census, its population was 45, in 9 families.

References 

Populated places in Ardal County